Remedies is the third album released by New Orleans R&B artist Dr. John. The photography was by Stephen C. LaVere, taken in 1969 at the Whisky a Go Go.

In a 2010 interview with Uncut, Dr. John explained the "bad trip" environment which led to the epic closing track "Angola Anthem":

"My managers put me in a psych ward. These guys were very bad people – I had gotten busted on a deal, and they got me bonded out of jail, and so when they did I could have got a parole violation. All of this stuff was so unconnected to music that it’s hard to relate it. A friend of mine had just come out of doing 40-something years in Angola [the infamous Louisiana State Penitentiary], he was just someone special in my heart – called Tangleye. And Tangleye says, 'I’m gonna sell you this song. Got it in Angola, but ain’t nobody ever cut this song…' Even now guys I know getting out of Angola know this song. It’s still a horrible place to be."

Track listing

Personnel
 Dr. John – vocals, piano, guitar
 Cold Grits – guitars, bass, drums
 Jessie Hill – backing vocals, percussion
 Shirley Goodman, Tami Lynn – backing vocals
Technical
 Charles Greene – producer
 Tom Dowd – producer
Stanley Moss - artwork, design
 Stephen C. LaVere – photography

References

1970 albums
Dr. John albums
Atco Records albums
Albums produced by Tom Dowd
Albums produced by Charles Greene (producer)